Chung Hyeon defeated Andrey Rublev in the final, 3–4(5–7), 4–3(7–2), 4–2, 4–2 to capture the 2017 Next Generation ATP Finals title.

The 2017 Next Generation ATP Finals was a men's exhibition tennis tournament played in Milan, Italy, from 7 to 11 November 2017. It was the season-ending event for the best singles players who were age 21 and under on the 2017 ATP World Tour.

Rules
A number of innovative rule changes were introduced in 2017 including best of five sets, first to four games in each set, tie break at 3-All, no-ad scoring (server’s choice) and no lets. There were amended rules regarding time, the match started five minutes from entry of second player onto court, a shot clock to ensure 25 second rule, a maximum of one medical timeout per player per match, limits on when coaches can talk to players and the public was allowed to move around during a match (except at baselines).

In September 2017, the ATP announced that there would be no line judges at the event. The only official on court was the umpire and all line calls were made by Hawk-Eye. All calls were therefore final; however, foot faults, which are usually called by the baseline official, could be challenged and would be reviewed by a camera monitoring the server's feet.

Qualification
The top seven players in the Emirates ATP Race to Milan qualified. The eighth spot was reserved for an Italian wild card, determined at a qualifying tournament. Eligible players must be 21 or under at the start of the year (born in 1996 or later for 2017 edition). 18-year-old Denis Shapovalov was the youngest and only teenage player.

Alexander Zverev withdrew from the tournament, as he would play the ATP Finals the following week.

Results

Final
  Chung Hyeon def.  Andrey Rublev, 3–4(5–7), 4–3(7–2), 4–2, 4–2

Third place match
  Daniil Medvedev def.  Borna Ćorić, walkover

Seeds

Draw

Finals

Group A

Group B

Controversy
For the tournament draw, players were asked to choose a female model to escort them onto the stage, and some of these models lifted or removed various articles of clothing to reveal a letter of the alphabet. This letter signified who would be playing whom. Widespread criticism followed. The ATP explained their choice, "The intention was to integrate Milan's rich heritage as one of the fashion capitals of the world.  However, our execution of the proceedings was in poor taste and unacceptable.  We deeply regret this and will ensure that there is no repeat of anything like it in the future."

References

2017
2017 ATP World Tour
2017 Next Generation ATP Finals
2017 in Italian tennis
Sports competitions in Milan
2010s in Milan
Next Generation
2017 tennis exhibitions